The modern Ukrainian presidency was formed when the Verkhovna Rada of the Ukrainian Soviet Socialist Republic passed a law on 5 July 1991 establishing the office of the "President of the Ukrainian Soviet Socialist Republic." Upon the proclamation of Ukrainian independence from the Soviet Union on 24 August 1991, the title was changed to the "President of Ukraine." The first election of the President of Ukraine, which was held on 1 December 1991, was won by Leonid Kravchuk.

All the presidents except for Volodymyr Zelenskyy have been people's deputies of the Verkhovna Rada prior to their election. Kravchuk was the first president to resign from the office, following a power struggle with Prime Minister Leonid Kuchma. After the 2014 Ukrainian revolution, Viktor Yanukovych abandoned his office and fled the country. He was subsequently impeached, and replaced by Oleksandr Turchynov as the Chairman of the Verkhovna Rada, who serves as acting president when the office is vacant. Early presidential elections were held on 25 May 2014 and won by Petro Poroshenko; Poroshenko was inaugurated as the fifth president on 7 June 2014. On 18 June 2015, Yanukovych was officially deprived of the title of President of Ukraine. After defeating Poroshenko Volodymyr Zelenskyy was inaugurated as the sixth and current president of Ukraine on 20 May 2019.

List
Party legend

Timeline

Social poll rankings of Ukrainian presidents

See also

 List of Ukrainian rulers, from ancient to modern times
 List of leaders of Ukraine, since Ukrainian independence in 1917

 List of prime ministers of Ukraine, since 1917
 List of chairmen of the Verkhovna Rada, since 1938

References
Notes

a. Although Leonid Kravchuk's official inauguration ceremony was conducted on 22 August 1992, he carried out most of the presidential responsibilities temporarily ceded to him as Chairman of the Verkhovna Rada from 24 August 1991 until 5 December 1991 when he became President of Ukraine in his own right.  He had served as Chairman of the Supreme Soviet of the Ukrainian SSR since 23 July 1990.

b. As President of the Ukrainian Soviet Socialist Republic.

c. "In the event of the pre-term termination of authority of the President of Ukraine in accordance with Articles 108, 109, 110 and 111 of this Constitution, the execution of duties of the President of Ukraine, for the period pending the elections and the assumption of office of the new President of Ukraine, shall be vested in the Chairperson of the Verkhovna Rada of Ukraine." —Constitution of Ukraine, Article 112.

Footnotes

External links
 

List
Ukrainian
Presidents
National Security and Defense Council of Ukraine